The Third Battle of Nanking in 1864 was the last major engagement of the Taiping Rebellion in the Qing Empire. With the fall of Nanking (now spelled Nanjing), the capital of the Taiping Heavenly Kingdom, the rebellion came to an end. The Hunan Army, an unpaid and barely fed militia commissioned by the Qing Empire, lost all their discipline and committed mass-scale random murder, wartime rape, looting and arson against the civilians of Nanjing, seen as "rebels". 100,000 "rebels" were reported dead by Zeng Guofan, the commander-in-chief of the Hunan Army.

Prelude
In June 1863 Qing Gen. Bao Chao took Jiufu Island and the Taiping Army lost control of the entire northern shore of the Yangtze. Imperial Gen. Bao Chao subsequently led his force across the river and camped on the southern bank outside the Shence Gate of Nanking. In September Zeng Guofan's younger brother, Gen. Zeng Guoquan, attacked and took the Shangfang Bridge region southeast of the city and the Jiangdong Bridge region to the southwest.  Zeng Guoquan continued his quest in the suburbs of Nanking, and by early November had succeeded in taking regions including Shangfang Gate, Gaoqiao Gate, Shuangqiao Gate, Qiqiaoweng, Muling Pass and Zhonghe Bridge. The Taiping Army had therefore lost all of its positions in the southwestern part of the Purple Mountain.  By mid-November regions including Chunhua, Jiexi, Longdu, Hushu, Sancha Town had fallen under the Qing army's control.  At the same time the Imperial navy commanded by Imperial Adm. Peng Yulin and his deputy, Yang Yuebin (杨岳斌, also known as Yang Zaifu 杨载福), took important regions including Gaochun and Eastern Dam (Dong Ba 东坝) with the help of Bao Chao's forces.  By late November the Taiping garrison at Lishui had surrendered to the Qing army.  As a result, the Taiping army was evicted from the region within 50 miles of Nanking.  On November 25, Zeng Guoquan and his subordinate, Gen. Xiao Qingyan, deployed troops at the Ming Xiaoling.  The only links to the outside left were the Shence and Taiping Gates.

On December 20, Li Xiucheng returned to Nanking from Danyang and urged Hong Xiuquan to abandon the Taiping capital the next day.  However, this suggestion was not accepted by Hong, who took overall command of the operation.  He declared that anyone who disobeyed him and God would be immediately executed.  This doomed the Taiping army and Nanking by creating widespread discontent and, coupled with other factors, eventually over 200,000 Taiping troops went out of Nanking and surrendered to the Imperial Chinese army during the course of the battle.  Those who refused to surrender but were also upset by Hong's decisions chose to break out while they still could, when the siege was still incomplete.  Hong, Li and others were unable to stop such acts.  On February 28, 1864, Tianbao Castle at the highest peak of the Purple Mountain fell under the Qing army's control.  On March 2, Zeng Guoquan deployed his troops to Shence and Taiping Gates. The siege of Nanking was completed.

The battle
On March 14, Zeng Guoquan attempted his first attack on Nanking using ladders, but this was beaten back by the defenders.  The imperial army then changed tactics, digging a total of ten tunnels at Chaoyang, Shence and Jinchuan Gates, and the defenders in turn countered by digging tunnels of their own and building a secondary wall behind the first.  Five days after the death of Hong Xiuquan on June 1, 1864, Li Xiucheng was finally put in charge of all military and political affairs, but it was already too late—the fate of the city and its defenders was sealed.

On July 3, Dibao Castle (地保城, nicknamed Dragon's Neck 龙脖子) on the Purple Mountain fell into the Qing army's hands.  This strategic location enabled the Qing to build several dozen artillery positions to bombard the entire city, thus suppressing the defenders' firepower and providing cover for other preparations to take the city.  One tactic of the attackers was to fill the space between the city wall and the mountain ridge at the Dragon's Neck with earth, sand, logs, rocks and grass, so the land surface was raised to the height of the city wall, thus paving the way to attack the city.  Another was to dig tunnels just 200 feet away from the city wall so that they could be filled with explosives to blow up the wall.  Operations within such close proximity of enemy fire were possible due to sufficient covering fire, thanks to the taking of Dibao Castle. The defenders' attempts to disrupt the preparations were continuously beaten back with heavy losses due to withering fire from the attackers. Two weeks later the preparation was complete.

Realizing the final attack was coming, on the night of July 18, Li Xiucheng ordered more than 1000 defenders to disguise themselves as attackers to sneak out of the city to destroy the tunnel, but the attackers were not fooled and beat back the thousand-man formation. The following afternoon at 1:00 the attackers detonated the explosives in the tunnel under Taiping Gate, the wall breaking and flying 2–10 km far down, killing several hundred people and collapsing a large section of the city wall.  The defenders put up a fierce fight, but were unable to drive back the attacking force of 60,000.  The attackers divided into four fronts after entering Nanking as previously planned:
The central front led by imperial Gen. Li Chendian attacked toward Hong Xiuquan's palace 
The right front led by imperial Gen. 刘连捷 (Liu Lianjie) pushed toward Shence gate to link up with imperial Gen. Zhu Nangui's force, which entered the gate via ladders; after the two teams had joined forces, they would attack westward toward Lion Mountain (Shizishan 狮子山) to take Yifeng Gate.
The central-left front led by imperial Gen. Peng Yuju attacked toward Tongji Gate.
The left front led by imperial Gen. Xiao Fusi attacked toward Chaoyang and Hongwu gates.
The street fights were fierce and bloody and the resistance was much tougher than expected. The attackers' artillery cover had to stop for fear of injuring their own. The defenders were very stubborn and expected to inflict heavy casualties on the attackers and hoped to drive them back outside the city.

After the fall of Chaoyang Gate, the defenders' morale collapsed and imperial Gen. Luo Fengyuan was able to break his force into the city from Jubao Gate, while imperial Gen. Li Jinzhou was able to break into the city from  Gate, linking up with forces led by imperial Gen. Peng Yuju.  At the same time, imperial Adm. Huang Yisheng led the imperial navy in taking  Zhongguan and then took the remaining fortresses still in the defenders' hands at the river banks, and helped imperial Gen. Chen Ti take two Shuixi and Hanxi gates.  By the evening every gate of the city was firmly in the hands of Qing forces.

Li Xiucheng immediately returned to Hong Xiuquan's palace after the defeat at the Taiping Gate in the morning, and took Hong's son with him to escape via Hanxi gate.  However, Li's force of several thousand were beaten back with heavy losses by imperial Gen. Chen Ti's troops and was forced to go to Qingliang Mountain.  At night Li Xiucheng's remaining force of 1000 went to Taiping Gate, disguised themselves as Qing soldiers and successfully escaped toward the Ming Xiaoling Mausoleum via the section of collapsed city wall because the Qing troops were busy looting and did not bother to stop them.  After massive looting the city was set on fire, which lasted until July 26, 1864.

Massacre

"The vaunted discipline of the Hunan Army broke down completely when Nanjing fell. The militia soldiers were unpaid and barely fed, and with this total victory in their final objective—after years of bitter campaign away from their families and their homes, [...] younger women were dragged off and the remaining able-bodied men were forced into service as porters to carry away huge loads of loot from the city—gold, silver, silks, furs, jade. Even some of Zeng Guoquan’s own aides who entered the city to investigate the looting were robbed and beaten by roving gangs of Hunan soldiers. First the soldiers set fire to the palaces; then they burned the homes."

Aftermath
Li Xiucheng did not get far after his initial breakout. Zeng Guoquan sent out a cavalry force of 700 after him and Li lost contact with Hong Xiuquan's son.  Most of the Taiping army's commanders failed to escape: Lie King Li Wancai was captured on July 21, at Chunhua Town, while Zhang Lin Shaozhang and Junior Western King Xiao Youhe was killed at Hushu Town on the same day.  On July 22, Li Xiucheng himself was captured alive near Square Mountain (Fangshan 方山).  On July 28, the overall commander of the battle, Zeng Guofan, reached Nanjing from Anqing and ordered Li to write his confession; he was executed after its completion on August 7.  Only Zun King Lai Wenguang succeeded in breaking out with his 3,000 cavalry to eventually join and lead the Nien Rebellion, during which he continued to fight for another four years.

The success of the Qing Army was partially due to the advanced weaponry adopted, namely firearms.  The first Chinese indigenously built bolt-action single-shot rifle appeared in 1864, and although they were few in number, proved themselves over other firearms and certainly over ancient weapons such as swords, sabres, spears and lances. The third battle of Nanking was a testing ground for the first modern Chinese firearms used in battle.

References

 Franz H. Michael, ed.The Taiping Rebellion: History and Documents (Seattle,: University of Washington Press, 1966). 3 vols. Volumes two and three select and translate basic documents.
  Translated and condensed from the author's publications in Chinese; especially strong on the military campaigns, based on the author's wide travels in China in the 1920s and 1930s.

Conflicts in 1864
Rebellions in the Qing dynasty
Nanking 1864
History of Nanjing
Massacres in China
1864 in China
March 1864 events
April 1864 events
May 1864 events
June 1864 events
July 1864 events